The gravel-downs ctenotus (Ctenotus serotinus)  is a species of skink found in Queensland in Australia.

References

serotinus
Reptiles described in 1986
Taxa named by Greg V. Czechura